The 1990 finals series was the first finals series to be played under the newly renamed Australian Football League. The series was scheduled to occur over four weekends in September 1990, culminating with the 94th AFL/VFL Grand Final at the Melbourne Cricket Ground on 29 September 1990. However, after Collingwood and West Coast drew in the qualifying final, the series was extended to five weeks, ending on 6 October. Collingwood would eventually go on to win the 1990 Premiership, breaking a famous 32-year drought marked by numerous Grand Final losses.

The finals system 

This was the 18th and final season in which the McIntyre final five system would be used. With the introduction of the Adelaide Crows the following season, the system would expand to become a final six.

Qualification 

Reigning premiers  rounded out the Top Five with 14 wins.

Finals

Qualifying Finals (Collingwood v West Coast)

Qualifying Final Replay (Collingwood v West Coast)

Elimination final (Melbourne v Hawthorn)

First Semi-Final (West Coast v. Melbourne)

Second Semi-Final (Collingwood v. Essendon)

Preliminary final (Essendon v West Coast)

Grand Final (Collingwood vs. Essendon)

See also 
1990 AFL season

Notes and references

External links 
 AFL official website
 RealFooty by The Age (Melbourne) Online 
 SportsAustralia (news and views)

AFL Finals Series
Afl Finals Series, 1990